Sveti Mihael may refer to several places in Slovenia: 

Pečica, a settlement in the Municipality of Šmarje pri Jelšah, known as Sveti Mihael until 1955
Šmihel, Nova Gorica, a settlement in the Municipality of Nova Gorica, known as Sveti Mihael until 1955
Sveti Mihael na Barju, the parish church in Črna Vas in the City Municipality of Ljubljana